Snyder Rini (born 27 July 1948) is a Solomon Islands politician who was briefly the eighth Prime Minister of the Solomon Islands from April to May 2006 and was Minister for Finance and Treasury 2000–2001, 2002–2003, 2007–2010 and 2014–2017. He has represented Marovo Constituency in National Parliament since 1997.

Rini was Permanent Secretary for the Ministry for Natural Resources in 1989 and was Chairman of Solomon Islands National Provident Fund from 1990 to 1996. He was also Permanent Secretary for the Ministry of National Planning and Development from 1994 to 1995 and Permanent Secretary for the Ministry of Agriculture and Fisheries from January 1997 to June 1997. He was first elected to the National Parliament in the August 1997 election. Under Prime Minister Manasseh Sogavare, he served as Minister of Finance and Treasury from July 2000 to December 2001. Re-elected to Parliament in December 2001, he became Deputy Prime Minister and Minister for National Planning & Development in that month; after one year, he became Deputy Prime Minister Minister for Finance and Treasury in December 2002, and he then became Deputy Prime Minister and Minister for Education and Human Resources Development in mid-2003, remaining in that post until April 2006.

Rini was re-elected to his seat in the April 2006 parliamentary election. Rini's subsequent election as Prime Minister by Parliament on 18 April 2006 caused riots as some claimed the election was fixed and that Rini's government would be unduly influenced by local Chinese businessmen and one or both of the mainland China and Republic of China (Taiwan) governments. Originally to be sworn in as Prime Minister on 19 April, this was delayed until the following day because of the riots and conducted without prior notice so as to avoid triggering further violence. In response to the violence, extra Australian, New Zealand and Fijian police and defence personnel were dispatched as part of the Regional Assistance Mission to Solomon Islands to try to enable his new government to regain control.

On 26 April, Rini resigned immediately before facing a motion of no confidence in Parliament. The news of his resignation caused celebrations in the streets of Honiara. His successor, Manasseh Sogavare, took office on 4 May 2006, defeating Rini's Deputy Prime Minister, Fred Fono, in the vote to replace Rini.

Fono, as Leader of the Opposition, named Rini as Shadow Minister of National Planning and Aid Coordination on 16 May 2006. After Sogavare was defeated in a no-confidence vote in December 2007, Rini became Minister for Finance and Treasury under Prime Minister Derek Sikua on 21 December 2007.

Following the replacement of Manasseh Sogavare as Prime Minister by Rick Houenipwela on 15 November 2017, Sogavare became Minister of Finance of the Solomon Islands, and Rini does not currently hold a portfolio.

References

Election as PM
Riots in response

1948 births
Living people
Prime Ministers of the Solomon Islands
Members of the National Parliament of the Solomon Islands
People from the Western Province (Solomon Islands)
Association of Independent Members politicians
Finance Ministers of the Solomon Islands
Education ministers of the Solomon Islands
Deputy Prime Ministers of the Solomon Islands